Barbero may refer to:

 Barbero, an Italian surname
 USS Barbero, a Balao-class submarine of the United States Navy
 Barbero-Immirzi parameter, a numerical coefficient appearing in loop quantum gravity
 Barbero rayado, tropical marine fish